AskforTask is a Toronto-based marketplace where people can outsource tasks like cleaning, handyman, and moving. Similar to Uber but for home services, the service is accessible on Android, iOS, and online.

History 
AskforTask was founded in 2013 by two Toronto based brothers; Muneeb M. Mushtaq and Nabeel Mushtaq. The brothers formed the idea after they struggled to find a reliable plumber. The company was launched when they saw a business opportunity to solve this problem.

First functioning as a website where users would post a task and provide their own pricing, it later evolved into a more comprehensive system of set pricing per hour. Through utilizing smart technology and a unique algorithm, they are able to match users with experienced and reliable Taskers.

Scope 
AskforTask is used in more than 100 cities across Canada, and has about 20,000 Taskers completing jobs. The company has enabled their clients to save around $100 million on day to day tasks including electrical work, plumbing, cleaning etc.

In 2014, AskforTask received $500,000 in seed funding and announced a dedicated app for its marketplace. By this time the site had received above 50,000 users and processed more than $2.5 million in tasks. The company has also been noted to be the country's largest task based marketplace.

The company has been noted for its success in multiple media sources including being featured in Metabridge Top 15 and Canada's hottest startups.

Business model and impact
AskforTask's source of income comes from a 15% fee that they take from the Tasker's total earnings on each task. The company runs on a marketplace platform where it connects Askers and Taskers and enables transactions without owning any service providers itself. Unlike traditional service companies (plumbers, movers, cleaners etc.), AskforTask scales by increasing the number of Askers who need help with tasks, and the Taskers who have the skills to provide the needed services. In addition to individuals using the service, businesses have also taken advantage of the platform. They utilize it as an easy access to a large workforce to request a team of Taskers to complete tasks like office clean-outs.

Operations 
The AskforTask app acts as the company's online marketplace that matches its users (Askers) with service providers (Taskers) such as handymen, cleaners, movers in the area to carry out jobs. The system allows workers to pick up jobs that fit with their schedule while providing their clients with quick and reliable access to low-cost services.

The review system of the Taskers app is similar to a freelance marketplace in that enables clients to rate Taskers depending on the quality of their service and enables the Taskers to gain and build up a reputation.

AskForTask Taskers 
The app has increased the availability of employment opportunities for Taskers looking for jobs. Some of the Taskers are students who are looking for part-time jobs for an extra cash as they would by babysitting for neighbors.

As the platform gained popularity, the Taskers earned themselves real world reputations. The Taskers on the platform have been featured in media for events such as Canadian Boxing Day.

Requirements for becoming a Tasker 
The requirements of becoming a Tasker include two years of previous experience in the task category, verification and a training process. The company verifies Taskers email addresses, social media accounts, phone numbers and their PayPal accounts to when they sign up so that the clients (Askers) are able to trust them while hiring. The company is revamping its website and app to allow for the option to be a "certified" Tasker by implementing online training, government background checks and a video interview.

References

External links
 

Freelance marketplace websites
Internet properties established in 2012
Online marketplaces of Canada
Companies based in Toronto